The 7th New York State Legislature, consisting of the New York State Senate and the New York State Assembly, met from January 21 to May 12, 1784, during the seventh year of George Clinton's governorship, at New York City.

Background
Under the provisions of the New York Constitution of 1777, the State Senators were elected on general tickets in the senatorial districts, and were then divided into four classes. Six senators each drew lots for a term of 1, 2, 3 or 4 years and, beginning at the election in April 1778, every year six Senate seats came up for election to a four-year term. Assemblymen were elected countywide on general tickets to a one-year term, the whole assembly being renewed annually.

On May 8, 1777, the Constitutional Convention had appointed the senators from the Southern District, and the assemblymen from Kings, New York, Queens, Richmond and Suffolk counties—the area which was under British control—and determined that these appointees serve in the Legislature until elections could be held in those areas, presumably after the end of the American Revolutionary War. The war ended when the Treaty of Paris was signed on September 3, 1783. The British forces left New York City on November 25, 1783, and subsequently a special election was held to fill the seats which had been occupied by appointment.

Elections
The State election was held from April 29 to May 1, 1783. Gov. George Clinton and Lt. Gov. Pierre Van Cortlandt were re-elected again. Joseph Gasherie, Jacobus Swartwout (both Middle D.) and Assemblyman Andrew Finck (Western D.) were elected to the Senate.

Sessions
The State Legislature met in New York City from January 21 to May 12, 1784. On January 27, the newly elected State senators from the Southern District drew lots to define their term lengths. On April 2, the Legislature changed the name of Charlotte County to Washington County, and Tryon County to Montgomery County.

State Senate

Districts
The Southern District (9 seats) consisted of Kings, New York, Queens, Richmond, Suffolk and Westchester counties.
The Middle District (6 seats) consisted of Dutchess, Orange and Ulster counties.
The Eastern District (3 seats) consisted of Charlotte (renamed Washington), Cumberland and Gloucester counties.
The Western District (6 seats) consisted of Albany and Tryon (renamed Montgomery counties.

Note: There are now 62 counties in the State of New York. The counties which are not mentioned in this list had not yet been established, or sufficiently organized, the area being included in one or more of the abovementioned counties.

Members
The asterisk (*) denotes members of the previous Legislature who continued in office as members of this Legislature. Ezra L'Hommedieu, Jacobus Swartwout and Andrew Finck changed from the Assembly to the Senate.

Employees
Clerk: Robert Benson until February 18, 1784
Abraham B. Bancker

State Assembly

Districts
The City and County of Albany (10 seats)
Charlotte County (renamed Washington County (4 seats)
Cumberland County (3 seats)
Dutchess County (7 seats)
Gloucester County (2 seats)
Kings County (2 seats)
The City and County of New York (9 seats)
Orange County (4 seats)
Queens County (4 seats)
Richmond County (2 seats)
Suffolk County (5 seats)
Tryon County (renamed Montgomery County) (6 seats)
Ulster County (6 seats)
Westchester County (6 seats)

Note: There are now 62 counties in the State of New York. The counties which are not mentioned in this list had not yet been established, or sufficiently organized, the area being included in one or more of the abovementioned counties.

Assemblymen
The asterisk (*) denotes members of the previous Legislature who continued as members of this Legislature.

Employees
Clerk: John McKesson

Notes

Sources
The New York Civil List compiled by Franklin Benjamin Hough (Weed, Parsons and Co., 1858) [see pg. 108 for Senate districts; pg. 112 for senators; pg. 148f for Assembly districts; pg. 161f for assemblymen]

1783 in New York (state)
1784 in New York (state)
007